Brigitte Wanderer (born 12 November 1966) is an Austrian butterfly and medley swimmer. She competed in three events at the 1984 Summer Olympics.

References

External links
 

1966 births
Living people
Austrian female butterfly swimmers
Austrian female medley swimmers
Olympic swimmers of Austria
Swimmers at the 1984 Summer Olympics
Place of birth missing (living people)